The 1812 United States presidential election in Connecticut took place between October 30 and December 2, 1812, as part of the 1812 United States presidential election. The state legislature chose nine representatives, or electors to the Electoral College, who voted for President and Vice President.

During this election, Connecticut cast its nine electoral votes to Independent Democratic Republican and Federalist supported candidate DeWitt Clinton. Nationally, traditional Democratic Republican candidate and incumbent President James Madison won by a narrow margin.

See also
 United States presidential elections in Connecticut

Notes

References

Connecticut
1812
1812 Connecticut elections